Thaddeus P. Dryja is an American ophthalmologist and geneticist known for his role in the 1986 discovery of the Rb tumor suppressor gene. He was the David G. Cogan Professor of Ophthalmology at Harvard University and was the Global Head of Ophthalmology Research at Novartis. He was elected a member of the National Academy of Sciences in 1996.

Education
Dryja graduated from Yale College in 1972 with a B.A. in chemistry and from Yale University Medical School in 1976. He interned at Waterbury Hospital in Connecticut from 1976 to 1977. He was a research fellow in experimental eye pathology at the Massachusetts Eye and Ear Infirmary, Harvard Medical School from 1977 to 1978. He completed an ophthalmology residency at Harvard Medical School in 1981. From 1981 to 1983 he was a research fellow in genetics and ophthalmology at the Children's Hospital Medical Center,  Harvard Medical School.

Career
In 1983 Dryja joined the faculty of the Department of Ophthalmology at Harvard Medical School, becoming a full professor in 1992. In 1992 he also became director of the David G. Cogan Pathology Laboratory at the Massachesetts Eye and Ear Infirmary. In 1993 he became the David Glendenning Cogan Professor of Ophthalmology at Harvard Medical School.

In 1996 Dryja was elected to the American National Academy of Sciences. The citation states that "Dryja is a pioneer in the molecular genetics of human eye disease. He has made seminal discoveries relating to the pathogenesis of retinoblastoma and retinitis pigmentosa and identified the mutant genes causing these conditions". His inaugural article was "Gene-based approach to human gene-phenotype correlations".

In 2006 Dryja became the head of Translational Medicine in Ophthalmology at Novartis Institutes for Biomedical Research (NIBR), the Novartis research institute in Cambridge, Massachusetts. From 2009 to 2017 he was the global head of ophthalmology research, supervising a research group of over 200. In 2017 he returned to Harvard Medical School as a clinical professor and eye pathologist.

Selected papers

References

External links
 Official website

Yale School of Medicine alumni
Harvard Medical School faculty
Living people
American medical researchers
Members of the United States National Academy of Sciences
Year of birth missing (living people)
Yale College alumni